Hoosac is an Algonquian word meaning place of stones.

Hoosic, Hoosick or Hoosac may refer to:

Communities
Hoosac, Montana, an unincorporated community in Fergus County
Hoosick, New York, a town in Rensselaer County
Hoosick Falls, New York, a village in the above town

Geography
Hoosac Range, a mountain range in Western Massachusetts
Hoosic River, a tributary of the Hudson River

Other
Hoosac School, an Episcopalian private school in Hoosick, New York
Hoosac Tunnel, also called Hoosic or Hoosick Tunnel, in Massachusetts